The 1989 Grand Prix International de Paris was held in Paris. Medals were awarded in the disciplines of men's singles, ladies' singles, pair skating, and ice dancing.

Results

Men

Ladies

Pairs

Ice dancing

External links
 Results

Grand Prix International De Paris, 1989
Internationaux de France
Figure
Figure skating in Paris
International figure skating competitions hosted by France